Sunstone is a microcline or oligoclase feldspar, which when viewed from certain directions  exhibits a spangled appearance. It has been found in Southern Norway, Sweden, various United States localities and on some beaches along the midcoast of South Australia.

Properties

Physical properties 

The optical effect is due to reflections from inclusions of red copper, hematite, or goethite, in the form of minute scales, which are hexagonal, rhombic, or irregular in shape, and are disposed parallel to the principal cleavage-plane. These inclusions give the stone an appearance something like that of aventurine, hence sunstone is known also as "aventurine-feldspar". The optical effect is called schiller and the color of Oregon Sunstone is due to copper. The middle part of this crystal sparkles, and usually the color is darkest in the middle and becomes lighter toward the outer edges.

The feldspar which usually displays the aventurine appearance is oligoclase, though the effect is sometimes seen in orthoclase: hence two kinds of sunstone are distinguished as "oligoclase sunstone" and "orthoclase sunstone".

Distribution
Sunstone was not popular until recently. Previously the best-known locality being Tvedestrand, near Arendal, in south Norway, where masses of the sunstone occur embedded in a vein of quartz running through gneiss.

Other locations include near Lake Baikal in Siberia, and several United States localities—notably at Middletown Township, Delaware County, Pennsylvania; Plush, Oregon; and Statesville, North Carolina.

The "orthoclase sunstone" variant has been found near Crown Point and at several other localities in New York, as also at Glen Riddle in Delaware County, Pennsylvania, and at Amelia Courthouse, Amelia County, Virginia.

Sunstone is also found in Pleistocene basalt flows at Sunstone Knoll in Millard County, Utah.

Andesine controversy

In the early 2000s, a new variety of red or green gemstone resembling sunstone and known as "Andesine" appeared in the gem market.  After much controversy and debate, most of these gemstones, allegedly sourced from China, were subsequently discovered to have been artificially colored by a copper diffusion process. A Tibetan source of bona fide (untreated) red andesine, however, was eventually verified by a number of independent groups of well-respected gemologists.

Oregon sunstone
A variety known as "Oregon sunstone" is found in Harney County, Oregon and in eastern Lake County north of Plush. Oregon Sunstone contains elemental copper. Oregon Sunstone is unique in that crystals can be quite large. The copper leads to variant color within some stones, where turning one stone will result in manifold hues: the more copper within the stone, the darker the complexion.

On August 4, 1987, the Oregon State Legislature designated Oregon Sunstone as its state gemstone by joint resolution.

See also
Rainbow lattice sunstone

References

External links

Mineralogy Database

Feldspar
Symbols of Oregon
Gemstones